Oliari and Others v. Italy (Application nos. 18766/11 and 36030/11) is a case decided in 2015 by the European Court of Human Rights (ECtHR) in which the Court established a positive obligation upon member states to provide legal recognition for same-sex couples.

Background
The ECtHR previously held in Schalk and Kopf v. Austria (2010)  that the Convention does not oblige member states to open marriage to same-sex couples, but if there is a different type of partnership scheme, same-sex couples may not be excluded per Vallianatos and Others v. Greece (2013).

Same-sex marriage is not legal in Italy, nor did the country at the time of the case provide any other type of recognition for either opposite-sex or same-sex couples.

The applicants were six Italian men (three same-sex couples) who submitted their cases in 2011 after Italian courts rejected their application to marry.

Judgment
The Court held that Italy, by not legally recognizing same-sex relationships, violated Article 8 of the European Convention on Human Rights ("Right to respect for private and family life").

In the review of relevant law, the Court also referenced Obergefell v. Hodges a United States Supreme Court ruling legalising same-sex marriage, which was published just a few days before the ECtHR deliberated in Oliari and Others v. Italy.

However, the ECtHR found that, despite the evolution of states in favour of legalising same-sex marriage, there is no violation of Article 12 (right to marry), and thus confirmed its previous ruling in Schalk and Kopf v. Austria (2010).

Aftermath 

In May 2016, almost one year after the Court's ruling, the Italian Parliament passed a civil unions law, which grant same-sex couples most of the legal protections enjoyed by opposite-sex married couples. The law came into effect in June of the same year.

See also
 Recognition of same-sex unions in Europe
 Recognition of same-sex unions in Italy
 List of LGBT-related cases before international courts and quasi-judicial bodies

References

External links
 Court judgment

2015 in case law
2015 in LGBT history
Article 8 of the European Convention on Human Rights
European Court of Human Rights cases involving Italy
Same-sex union case law
Recognition of same-sex unions in Europe
LGBT rights in Italy